The canton of Condat-sur-Vienne is an administrative division of the Haute-Vienne department, western France. It was created at the French canton reorganisation which came into effect in March 2015. Its seat is in Condat-sur-Vienne.

It consists of the following communes:
 
Boisseuil
Condat-sur-Vienne
Eyjeaux
Pierre-Buffière
Saint-Bonnet-Briance
Saint-Genest-sur-Roselle
Saint-Hilaire-Bonneval
Saint-Jean-Ligoure
Saint-Maurice-les-Brousses
Saint-Paul
Solignac
Le Vigen

References

Cantons of Haute-Vienne